The 1961–62 NBA season was the Detroit Pistons' 14th season in the NBA and fifth season in the city of Detroit.  The team moved to newly built Cobo Arena in the 1961-62 season.

The Pistons were led by guard Gene Shue (19.0 ppg, 5.8 apg, NBA All-Star) and forward Bailey Howell (19.9 ppg, 12.6 rpg).  The Pistons also featured rookie Ray Scott (13.3 ppg, 11.5 rpg), who would go on to a long career with the Pistons as a player and eventually coaching the team. For the thirteenth straight season, the Pistons made the playoffs, with this being the seventh time they finished third place in the Western Division. Detroit faced the Cincinnati Royals and star Oscar Robertson in the Western Division semifinals; the Pistons won in four games to advance to the Division Finals for the first time in four years, facing the Los Angeles Lakers. The Lakers beat the Pistons in six games. While the Pistons would make the postseason the following year, this was the last postseason series victory for the Pistons until 1976.

Regular season

Season standings

x – clinched playoff spot

Record vs. opponents

Game log

Playoffs

|- align="center" bgcolor="#ccffcc"
| 1
| March 16
| Cincinnati
| W 123–122
| Ray Scott (34)
| Cobo Arena
| 1–0
|- align="center" bgcolor="#ffcccc"
| 2
| March 17
| @ Cincinnati
| L 107–129
| Ohl, Shue (18)
| Cincinnati Gardens
| 1–1
|- align="center" bgcolor="#ccffcc"
| 3
| March 18
| Cincinnati
| W 118–107
| Bailey Howell (27)
| Cobo Arena
| 2–1
|- align="center" bgcolor="#ccffcc"
| 4
| March 20
| @ Cincinnati
| W 112–111
| Don Ohl (33)
| Cincinnati Gardens
| 3–1
|-

|- align="center" bgcolor="#ffcccc"
| 1
| March 24
| @ Los Angeles
| L 108–132
| Bailey Howell (27)
| Walter Dukes (12)
| Los Angeles Memorial Sports Arena
| 0–1
|- align="center" bgcolor="#ffcccc"
| 2
| March 25
| @ Los Angeles
| L 112–127
| Don Ohl (33)
| Bailey Howell (13)
| Los Angeles Memorial Sports Arena
| 0–2
|- align="center" bgcolor="#ffcccc"
| 3
| March 27
| Los Angeles
| L 106–111
| Gene Shue (26)
| Walter Dukes (25)
| Cobo Arena
| 0–3
|- align="center" bgcolor="#ccffcc"
| 4
| March 29
| Los Angeles
| W 118–117
| Bailey Howell (24)
| Ray Scott (23)
| Cobo Arena
| 1–3
|- align="center" bgcolor="#ccffcc"
| 5
| March 31
| @ Los Angeles
| W 132–125
| Willie Jones (27)
| Ray Scott (13)
| Los Angeles Memorial Sports Arena
| 2–3
|- align="center" bgcolor="#ffcccc"
| 6
| April 3
| Los Angeles
| L 117–123
| Ray Scott (22)
| —
| Cobo Arena
| 2–4
|-

See also
 1962 in Michigan

References

Detroit Pistons seasons
Detroit
Detroit Pistons
Detroit Pistons